Pramod Ranade is an Indian playback singer, violinist and music arranger in Marathi industry.

Career
Ranade started his career as singer and harmonium player and is performing stage shows for Programmes.

Programs
 Mantarlelya Chaitrabanat
 Smaranyatra
 Smarangaani
 Rang Sare Tujhe
 Ranga-Taranga
 Mi Niranjanatil Vaat
 Majhe Jeevan Gaane
 Suvarna-Sangeet
 Geetramayan’.

Film singing
 Tu Tithe Mee
 Murali

Musical work
 Singer, Violinist and provided administrative assistance for the E-TV (Now Colors Marathi) and Alpha Marathi (Now Z Marathi) channel programmes : 'Devachiye Dwari','Jeevan Gane', and 'Sur-Taal'.
 Technical Assistance for Sudhir Moghe's Programme 'Kavita Panopani'
 Singer, Violinist and music arranger for the cable network programme 'Maiboli' in Pune.
 Singer, violinist and music arranger for the programme and audio-video cassettes of 'Mee Niranjanatil Vaat' and 'Amrutachi Godi'
 Contributed as a Violinist for the Audio-Video Project 'Smaranyatra'

Awards and recognition
 Regional Filmfare award for film 'Tu Tithe Mee'

Personal life
Pramod Ranade has son. Hrishikesh Ranade is an Indian playback singer in Marathi film industry. Hrishikesh is married to singer Prajkta Ranade

References

Living people
Bollywood playback singers
Indian male singers
Marathi playback singers
Place of birth missing (living people)
Marathi-language singers
1955 births